Barun is a small town in Barun Panchayat Block of Aurangabad district of Bihar, India.

The Pincode of Barun is 824112.

References

Villages in Aurangabad district, Bihar